K-1 World MAX 2002 World Tournament Final was a kickboxing event promoted by the K-1 Organisation. It was the inaugural K-1 World MAX final for middleweight kickboxers (70 kg/154 lb weight class), consisting of eight finalists and two reserve fighters, with all bouts fought under K-1 rules.  The tournament fighters had qualified via preliminary tournaments or had been invited due to their achievements in the world of kickboxing and Muay Thai (more information on the fighters is displayed by the bulleted list below).  In total there were ten fighters at the event, representing seven countries.  

The tournament winner was Albert Kraus who defeated Kaolan Kaovichit by first round knockout to become the first ever K-1 MAX champion.  Of the two fighters, Kraus had the tougher path to the final having to had to beat Shane Chapman and home favourite Masato en route to the final.  The event was held at the Nippon Budokan in Tokyo, Japan on Saturday, 11 May 2002.  

Finalists
 Shane Chapman - K-1 Oceania MAX 2001 champion, x2 Muay Thai world champion
 Marino Deflorin - invitee, multiple Muay Thai world champion (W.A.K.O. Pro, W.K.A., W.K.N., I.K.B.O.)
 Kaolan Kaovichit - invitee, Lumpinee Stadium finalist 
 Takayuki Kohiruimaki - K-1 Japan MAX 2002 runner up, I.S.K.A. oriental rules super welterweight world champion '00
 Albert Kraus - invitee, W.K.A. world champion '01 
 Duane Ludwig - K-1 World MAX 2002 USA champion, x2 I.K.F. U.S.A. national Muay Thai amateur champion
 Masato - K-1 Japan MAX 2002 champion, I.S.K.A. oriental rules welterweight world champion '00, A.J.K.F welterweight champion '99
 Zhang Jiapo - invitee, Sanda fighter

Reservists
 Ohno 崇 
 - K-1 Japan MAX 2002  3rd place, I.S.K.A. Muay Thai middleweight world champion 
 Changpuak Weerasaklek - invitee, Rajadamnern Stadium finalist

K-1 World MAX 2002 World Tournament Final

Results

See also
List of K-1 events
List of K-1 champions
List of male kickboxers

References

External links
K-1 Official Website
K-1sport.de - Your Source for Everything K-1

K-1 MAX events
2002 in kickboxing
Kickboxing in Japan
Sports competitions in Tokyo